Dorothy Bruchholz Goodman (born 1926)  is an American educator closely associated with the charter school movement. She was educated at Bryn Mawr College and received her Ph.D. from the University of London. She founded and served as Director of the Washington International School; launching the school with three 4-year-olds in the basement of her home in 1966 and served as headmistress until 1985, when the school enrolled 530 students, ranging in age from 3 to 18, representing 80 nations.

Goodman was a founder of the International Baccalaureate: North America, and has been credited for the success of that program. She has served as Chairwoman of Friends of International Education (FIE) and president of Committee for Public Autonomous Schools (COMPASS), an organization that supports the founding of public charter schools. She advocates the teaching of Chinese and Russian to American students, saying she was inspired in this by Lee Kuan Yew, long-time prime minister of Singapore. She has also been a trustee of the UWC-USA, and a visible and vocal spokesperson for educational causes globally.

References

1926 births
Living people
Alumni of the University of London
American educators
Bryn Mawr College alumni
American expatriates in the United Kingdom